Rajesh Mazumder is the owner of "Chef of India", an Indian themed restaurant in Toronto, Ontario, Canada.

Life
Mazumder was born in India in a town of West Bengal called Thakurnagar. After working several years in India, Mazumder went to the United States. He was the executive chef of Garden Cafe, a restaurant which was very close to WTC at Southend Avenue.

Mazumder immigrated to Toronto, Canada in 2000. His first restaurant opened at 30 Eglinton Avenue East in 2004. In 2009 he opened another branch of "Chef of India" at 1415 Yonge Street.

References 

Year of birth missing (living people)
Living people
Indian emigrants to Canada
Indian chefs